John Brown Francis Herreshoff (February 7, 1850 – January 30, 1932) was   second winner of the Perkin Medal. He was also the president of The General Chemical Company.

Biography
Herreshoff was born February 7, 1850, Bristol, Rhode Island, to the marriage of Charles Frederick Herreshoff III (1809–1888) and Julia Ann Lewis (1811–1901). Herreshoff was a metallurgical chemist affiliated with the firm of Herreshoff Manufacturing Company, builders of yachts and torpedo boats. Herreshoff was also the president of The General Chemical Company, which was founded in 1899 and merged in 1920 with Allied Corporation.

Recipient of the Perkin Medal
Herreshoff, in 1908, received the Perkin Medal, an award conferred annually by the American section of the Society of Chemical Industry to a scientist residing in America for an "innovation in applied chemistry resulting in outstanding commercial development." It is considered the highest honor given in the U.S. chemical industry.

Death
Herreshoff died January 30, 1932, at the home of his daughter in New York City. Interment was at Laurel Hill Cemetery, Philadelphia.

Family 
John Brown Francis Herreshoff was married four times. 
<li> He first married – on February 9, 1876 – Grace Eugenia Dyer (1851–1880), with whom he had a daughter, Louise Chamberlain Herreshoff (1876–1967), who went on to become a painter.
<li> After Grace's death, he married – on October 25, 1882, in Philadelphia – Emaline Duval ("Mildred") Lee (1863–1930). From that marriage, he had two sons and a daughter. One of the sons, Frederick Herreshoff (1888–1920), became a noted American amateur golfer. By way his daughter from that marriage, Sarah Lothrop Herreshoff (1889–1958), a grandson, Guido Borgianni (it) (1914–2011), became a noted Italian painter.
<li> Herreshoff and Mildred divorced June 4, 1919, in Manhattan, and five days later, on June 9, 1919, Herreshoff married Carrie Lucas Ridley (1878–1924), her second.
<li> On October 5, 1924 ( months after Carrie's death), Herreshoff married Carrie's sister, Irma Grey Ridley (1872–1946).

References

External links
 

1850 births
1932 deaths
Herreshoff family
Presidents of the American Chemical Society
American chemists